The Power of 10 Rules were created in 2006 by Gerard J. Holzmann of the NASA/JPL Laboratory for Reliable Software.  The rules are intended to eliminate certain C coding practices which make code difficult to review or statically analyze.  These rules are a complement to the MISRA C guidelines and have been incorporated into the greater set of JPL coding standards.

Rules
The ten rules are:
 Avoid complex flow constructs, such as goto and recursion.
 All loops must have fixed bounds.  This prevents runaway code.
 Avoid heap memory allocation.
 Restrict functions to a single printed page.
 Use a minimum of two runtime assertions per function.
 Restrict the scope of data to the smallest possible.
 Check the return value of all non-void functions, or cast to void to indicate the return value is useless.
 Use the preprocessor sparingly.
 Limit pointer use to a single dereference, and do not use function pointers.
 Compile with all possible warnings active; all warnings should then be addressed before release of the software.

Uses
The NASA study of the Toyota electronic throttle control firmware found at least 243 violations of these rules.

See also
 Life critical system
Coding conventions
Software quality
Software assurance

Further reading

References

External links
 Open Source Satellite: How do you make software that is reliable enough for space missions?

C (programming language)